Yana Volodymyrivna Derkach (born 10 July 1998) is a Ukrainian footballer, who plays as a midfielder for Ankara BB Fomget GS in the Turkish Women's Football Super League, and for the Ukraine women's national team.

Club career 
Derkach played for the Oleshky-based club Voskhod Stara Maiachka in the 2019–20 Vyshcha Liha season of Ukrainian Women's League. She capped in 16 matches and scored one goal. Her team finished the season third placed.

By August 2020, Derkach moved to Turkey, and signed with the Gaziantep-based 2019-20 Turkish Women's First League top club ALG Spor. The next season, she transferred to Ankara BB Fomget GS.

References 

1998 births
Living people
Ukrainian women's footballers
Women's association football midfielders
Ukraine women's international footballers
Ukrainian expatriate women's footballers
Ukrainian expatriate sportspeople in Turkey
Expatriate women's footballers in Turkey
ALG Spor players
Turkish Women's Football Super League players
Fomget Gençlik ve Spor players